Seven at Eleven is an American comedy/variety show that aired live on NBC Monday and Wednesday night from 11:00 pm to midnight Eastern time from May 28, 1951 to June 27, 1951 on the nights when Broadway Open House wasn't on.

Regulars
Sid Gould
George Frees
Sammy Petrillo
Dorothy Keller
Jane Scott
Denise Lor
Betsy Luster
Jack Stanton
Jackie Loughery
Herbie Faye
Milton Delugg and his Sextet

References

External links

1951 American television series debuts
1951 American television series endings
1950s American variety television series
NBC original programming
American live television series
Black-and-white American television shows